Daramrud-e Olya (also Romanized as Dārāmrūd-e ‘Olyā) is a village in Sar Firuzabad Rural District, Firuzabad District, Kermanshah County, Kermanshah Province, Iran. At the 2006 census, its population was 126, in 28 families.

References 

Populated places in Kermanshah County